José Manuel Galdames Ibáñez (born 15 June 1970 in Barakaldo, Basque Country) is a Spanish retired footballer who played as a central defender.

External links

1970 births
Living people
Spanish footballers
Footballers from Barakaldo
Association football defenders
La Liga players
Segunda División players
Segunda División B players
Bilbao Athletic footballers
Athletic Bilbao footballers
SD Compostela footballers
SD Eibar footballers
Ligue 1 players
Ligue 2 players
Toulouse FC players
Spain youth international footballers
Spain under-21 international footballers
Spain under-23 international footballers
Spanish expatriate footballers
Expatriate footballers in France
Spanish expatriate sportspeople in France